The 2012–13 Irish Cup was the 133rd edition of the premier knock-out cup competition in Northern Irish football since its introduction in 1881. The competition began on 15 September 2012 with the first round and ended on 4 May 2013 with the final. The cup was sponsored by JJB Sports until October 2012, when the company went into administration. The competition remained without a principal sponsor, but the final was known as the Marie Curie Irish Cup final, after the IFA awarded the naming rights for the final to the charity Marie Curie Cancer Care.

Linfield were the defending champions, after defeating Crusaders 4–1 in the 2012 final to win the cup for the sixth time in seven seasons. However, in a tie that was a repeat of the previous two finals, they were knocked out in the fifth round by Crusaders, who inflicted Linfield's first defeat in the competition in four years.

The eventual winners were Glentoran, coming from a goal behind to defeat Cliftonville 3–1 after extra time to win their first Irish Cup in nine years. Glentoran qualified for the 2013–14 UEFA Europa League first qualifying round.

Format and schedule
119 clubs took part in this season's competition, an increase on the 116 clubs that took part the previous season. Clubs from level 4 and below on the Northern Ireland football league system entered in the first round, and played against other lower league clubs in the first three rounds. Depending on the number of participants, some clubs may be given a bye into the second round. Nine clubs were given a bye this season.

28 of the 30 IFA Championship clubs that started the season entered in the fourth round. Newry City folded after the start of the season and, of the remaining 29 clubs, PSNI did not enter on time. The IFA Championship clubs were joined in the fourth round by the lower league clubs that progressed through the first three rounds.

The winners from the fourth round matches joined the clubs from the IFA Premiership in the fifth round, and from then on it was a straight knock-out competition through to the final. Replays were only used in the fifth round, sixth round and quarter final stages, otherwise extra time and penalties were used to determine the winner if necessary.

Results

First round
The draw for the first round was held on 16 August 2012 with the matches played on 15 September 2012.

Ballynahinch United, Bangor Amateurs, Crumlin United, Dunmurry Rec., Killyleagh Youth, Magherafelt Sky Blues, Mountjoy United, Newbuildings United and Saintfield United all received byes into the second round.

|-
|colspan="3" style="background:#E8FFD8;"|15 September 2012

|}
Source: irishfa.com

1Wellington Recreation were disqualified for fielding an ineligible player, their opponents were reinstated.

Second round
The draw for the second round took place on 25 September 2012. The 35 winners from the first round matches entered the competition at this round, along with the 9 clubs that received a bye. The matches were played on 20 and 27 October 2012.

|-
|colspan="3" style="background:#E8FFD8;"|20 October 2012

|-
|colspan="3" style="background:#E8FFD8;"|27 October 2012

|}

Source: irishfa.com

2Comber Recreation and Killyleagh Youth were both disqualified for fielding an ineligible player, their opponents were reinstated.

Third round
The draw for the third round took place on 1 November 2012. The 22 winners from the second round matches entered the draw for this round, with 20 of the clubs drawn to play against each other. Oxford United Stars and Rathfriland Rangers both received a bye into the fourth round because of the demise of Championship club Newry City, and the failure of fellow Championship club PSNI to enter on time.  This had reduced the number of teams in the fourth round and hence it was decided to draw two byes in the third round to make up the requisite fourth-round numbers. The matches were played on 17 November 2012.

|-
|colspan="3" style="background:#E8FFD8;"|17 November 2012

|}

Source: irishfa.com

Fourth round
The draw for the fourth round was made on 22 November 2012. 28 of the 29 clubs from the IFA Championship entered the competition at this stage (PSNI not having entered). They were joined by the 10 winners of the third round matches and the two clubs that received byes. The matches were played on 8 December 2012.

|-
|colspan="3" style="background:#E8FFD8;"|8 December 2012

|}

Source: irishfa.com

3Drumaness Mills were disqualified for fielding an ineligible player, their opponents received a walkover.

Fifth round
The fifth round draw was made on 13 December 2012. The 12 clubs from the IFA Premiership entered the competition at this stage, along with the 20 winners from the fourth round matches. The matches were played on 12 January 2013, with the replays being played on 22 January and 4 February 2013.

|-
|colspan="3" style="background:#E8FFD8;"|12 January 2013

|}

Replays

|-
|colspan="3" style="background:#E8FFD8;"|22 January 2013

|-
|colspan="3" style="background:#E8FFD8;"|4 February 2013

|}

Source: irishfa.com

Sixth round
The sixth round draw was made after the fifth round matches were played on 12 January. The matches were played on 9 and 26 February 2013. Northern Amateur Football League club Kilmore Recreation were the lowest ranked side in the draw as the only club from outside the IFA Premiership or IFA Championship left in the competition.

|-
|colspan="3" style="background:#E8FFD8;"|9 February 2013

|-
|colspan="3" style="background:#E8FFD8;"|26 February 2013

|}

Source: irishfa.com

Quarter-finals
The quarter-final draw was made after the sixth round matches were played on 9 February. The matches were played on 2 March 2013, with one replay taking place on 12 March. Northern Amateur Football League club Kilmore Recreation were the lowest ranked side in the draw as the only club from outside the IFA Premiership or IFA Championship left in the competition.

Replay

Semi-finals
The semi-final draw was made after the quarter-final matches were played on 2 March. The matches were played on 6 April 2013.

Final
The final took place on 4 May 2013 at Windsor Park.

References

External links
 Official site
 nifootball.co.uk
 2012–13 Irish Cup at Soccerway

2012-13
Cup
2012–13 domestic association football cups